Folketing elections were held in Denmark on 26 April 1920, except in the Faroe Islands, where they were held on 20 May. The election campaign was the most aggressive and bitter in Denmark in the 20th century. Voter turnout was 80.6% in Denmark proper and 58.8% in the Faroe Islands.

Background
In what is referred to as Easter Crisis of 1920, on 29 March King Christian X dismissed the government, the Cabinet of Zahle II consisting of members of the Danish Social Liberal Party, replacing it with a caretaker cabinet led by Otto Liebe on 30 March, as he was of the opinion that Central Schleswig should be returned to Denmark regardless of the outcome of the Schleswig Plebiscites. This led to massive protests and was referred to as a coup d'état by the Danish Social Liberal Party and the Social Democratic Party. On 5 April 1920 a compromise was reached, the government was replaced with another caretaker cabinet headed by Michael Pedersen Friis and a new election was to be held as soon as possible.

Electoral system
Prior to the elections, a new electoral law was enacted, with all seats now elected by proportional representation from a mix of multi-member constituencies and a nationwide district.

Results

References

2020 04
Denmark
Folketing 1
Denmark